Simon Gandolfi (b. London, February 11th 1933) is an English writer and long-distance motorcycle rider.

2007–2008, Mexico to Tierra del Fuego via Mexico, Guatemala, Honduras, Nicaragua, Costa Rica, Panama, Colombia, Ecuador, Peru, Bolivia and Argentina:  on a 125 cc Honda
April–December 2009, Tierra del Fuego to New York:  on the same Honda
November–June 2010 – 2011, India:  on 125 cc Honda Stunner 
April–October 2013, India:  TVS Motor Company TVS Phoenix 125

A 2010 tour of India was undertaken in defiance of the 2008 Mumbai attacks, of which he said "The attack infuriated me and I saw all the tourists cancelling and so I rode around India, and if a grand old man like me can ride around India at my age, it can't be that dangerous." The 2008 solo ride was undertaken when Gandolfi was 73, 2010 when he was 77, and the 2013 solo ride around his 80th birthday. The 2013 ride around India was published as a series of contributions to The Guardian's "Backpacking" travelogue section between June and October of that year. The column on his ride, which was planned to span India to England, ended when he suffered broken ribs and other injuries after being kicked off his bike by a heifer in the road.

Gandolfi's father, Ralph Vincent Gandolfi-Hornyold, Duca Gandolfi, Marchese di Melati, died in 1938. He is the stepson of Lt. Colonel Euan Rabagliati DFC, MC, Legion of Honour, British pilot in World War 1 and World War II MI6 officer.

Bibliography 
Even With The Shutters Closed 1965 Peter Davies ISBN 978-1871565591.

100 Kilo Club. Wildwood House 1975 ISBN 978-0704501621

The Reluctant Stud, Sphere. 1981. ISBN 978-0722138038

France Security. Frederick Muller. 1981. ISBN 978-0-856341168

Golden Girl. Orion. 1992. ISBN 978-1855920088

Golden Web. Orion. 1994. ISBN 978-1857975116 

Golden Vengeance. Orion. 1995 ISBN 978-1855928213

White Sands. Orion. 1996. ISBN 978-1857976915

Aftermath. Orion. 2000. ISBN 978-0752832296

 
Arcadia Press reprint 2013 
An Indian Love Affair. Arcadia. 2016. ISBN 978-1910050811

References

External links

1933 births
Living people
Long-distance motorcycle riders
People from London
English travel writers
21st-century English writers